Howard McCrary is an American musician, entertainer, and actor. He was nominated for Grammy award in 1986 for a gospel record entitled, "So Good."  Credited for vocal performances and arrangements on the music albums of Chaka Khan, Quincy Jones, Michael Jackson, Earth, Wind & Fire, Edwin Hawkins, Kristle Murden, Danniebelle Hall, and many others. He also appears in the first Gospel Album The Chimes (released on July, 2009) of The Chung Brothers (Henry & Roger Chung) in Hong Kong, acting as arranger, pianist and singer in the song Soul Seranade, Part II.

He guest-starred in the television series Amen, and Martin.

After arriving in Birmingham, England with the Phil Upchurch Combo on the final date of a UK tour in 1993, McCrary remained in the city for a further year. During this time he performed regularly at the Ronnie Scotts jazz club then operating in the city, with one evening's show later released on the Big Bear Records album Moments Like This.

McCrary is the father of actors Darius McCrary and Donovan McCrary.

References

External links
 
 Howard McCrary's own website

American jazz singers
American gospel singers
American keyboardists
American performers of Christian music
American rhythm and blues musicians
Living people
Year of birth missing (living people)
Place of birth missing (living people)
American male pianists
21st-century American pianists
American male jazz musicians
African-American pianists
21st-century African-American male singers
20th-century African-American male singers